Commonwealth v. Tluchak, 166 Pa. Super. 16, 70 A.2d 657 (1950).
Judge Reno wrote the opinion of the Court. This in the Commonwealth of Pennsylvania in the United States case involves defendants convicted of larceny.

In Tluchak the defendants had sold a farm to another couple. Between the time of sale and the time the purchasers moved in, the defendants took several items that were on the property. In that period, the defendant-sellers were not the legal owners of the property, but they were the legal possessors of it. The Court held that the defendants couldn't be convicted of larceny because they never interfered with the purchasers' possessory interest.

This case not only highlights that element of larceny but also helps show how larceny grew out of criminal trespass.

Background

Procedural Posture 
A jury convicted a husband and wife of larceny. The husband's sentence was restitution and a fine of $50; the wife's sentence was suspended. The couple appealed their convictions to the Superior Court of Pennsylvania.

Facts 
The appellants agreed in writing to sell their farm to another couple. When the purchasers moved in they found several things missing that had been on the property at the time of purchase: a commode, washstand, hay carriage, electric stove cord, and 30-35 peach trees. The sale agreement did not cover personal property, but did cover: "All buildings, plumbing, heating, lighting fixtures, screens, storm sash, shades, blinds, awnings, shrubbery and plants." The purchasers also claimed there was an oral agreement that included the missing items not covered by the written sale agreement, though the appellants denied this. The Commonwealth charged larceny for all the missing items.

Issue & Holding 
 Are sellers who refuse or fail to deliver goods the goods they sold to another guilty of larceny?
 No, larceny cannot occur until another person takes legal possession of a good.

Analysis 
Though the appellants argued that there was insufficient evidence to support a conviction because the contract didn't cover the items listed in the indictment, the Court assumed a sale had occurred.

Rule 
Larceny is a crime of criminal trespass on the possessory rights of another. 
A person lawfully possessing another's property who converts the property to his own use, or otherwise deprives the owner of its use cannot be guilty of larceny because he lawfully received the property; the possessor, however, could be guilty of fraudulent conversion.

Application 
Even if the appellants had sold the property when they sold the farm, they would still have been in legal possession of the property until the purchasers had taken lawful possession—i.e. moved into the farm. Therefore, they could not be guilty of larceny, because they legally possessed the property. While they might be guilty of fraudulent conversion or larceny by bailee, the prosecution did not charge those crimes.

Disposition 
The Court reversed the judgments and sentences below and discharged the defendants.

References 

1950 in Pennsylvania